Razezd 15 km is a rural locality (a passing loop) in "Gorod Akhtubinsk" of Akhtubinsky District, Astrakhan Oblast, Russia. The population was 20 as of 2010.

References 

Rural localities in Akhtubinsky District